Thyestilla gebleri is a species of beetle in the family Cerambycidae. It was described by Faldermann in 1835, originally under the genus Saperda. It is known from Mongolia, Japan, Russia, China, North Korea, and South Korea. It feeds on Boehmeria nivea and Cannabis sativa.

Varietas
 Thyestilla gebleri var. subuniformis Breuning, 1952
 Thyestilla gebleri var. pubescens (Thomson, 1864)
 Thyestilla gebleri var. funebris (Gahan, 1888)
 Thyestilla gebleri var. transitiva Breuning, 1952

References

Saperdini
Beetles described in 1835